Shibnagar is a locality in Agartala, Tripura.

The Gedu Miar Mosque is a  mosque located in Shibnagar area in Agartala in Tripura in the India.

Neighbourhoods in Agartala